Simone Galli (born 24 March 1978) is an Italian freestyle skier. He competed at the 2002 Winter Olympics and the 2006 Winter Olympics.

References

External links
 

1978 births
Living people
Italian male freestyle skiers
Olympic freestyle skiers of Italy
Freestyle skiers at the 2002 Winter Olympics
Freestyle skiers at the 2006 Winter Olympics
Sportspeople from the Province of Sondrio
21st-century Italian people